List of activists who have campaigned for greater awareness of climate change issues

A 
Lucía Abello
John Abraham
Nerilie Abram
Xiomara Acevedo
Aigagalefili Fepulea'i Tapua'i
Matilde Alvim
Steven Amstrup
Zanagee Artis
Isabelle Axelsson
Aliza Ayaz
Evelyn Acham

B 
Billy Barr
Xiye Bastida
Tzeporah Berman
Jakob Blasel
Kauthar Bouchallikht
Gail Bradbrook
Laurens Jan Brinkhorst
Sian Brooke
Nina Py Brozovich

C 
William L. Chameides
Adélaïde Charlier
Quannah Chasinghorse
Chikondi Chabvuta
Steven Chu
Violet Coco
Code Rood
Haven Coleman
Raphaël Coleman
Colette Pichon Battle
Amariyanna Copeny
Greg Craven
Irena Creed
Severn Cullis-Suzuki

D 
Eriel Deranger
Anuna De Wever
Mark Diesendorf
Michelle Dilhara
Tom Dinwoodie
Flossie Donnelly
Steven Donziger
Iris Duquesne

E 
Nisreen Elsaim
Katie Eder

F 
Mónica Feria Tinta
Christopher Field
Christiana Figueres
Tim Flannery
Christopher Flavin
Billy Fleming
Luuk Folkerts
Jerome Foster II

G 
Rodne Galicha
Eric Garcetti
David Gardiner
Amitav Ghosh
John Gibbons
Paul Gilding
Holly Gillibrand
Sherri W. Goodman
Eban Goodstein
Al Gore (see: Environmental activism of Al Gore)
Lucy Gray
Pete Gray
Robin Grove-White
Helena Gualinga
Rhiana Gunn-Wright

H 
Roger Hallam
Denis Hayes
Shaun Hendy
Jamie Henn
Isra Hirsi
Paul Hudson
Anna Hughes

I 
Risto Isomäki

J 
Fatou Jeng
Kathy Jetn̄il-Kijiner

K 
Kaluki Paul Mutuku
Licypriya Kangujam
Salsabila Khairunnisa
Sophia Kianni
Phil Kingston
Jesse Klaver
Naomi Klein
Vikram Kolmannskog
Marie Christina Kolo
Patricia Kombo
KP Khanal

L 
Melina Laboucan-Massimo
Ollie Langridge
Dominika Lasota
Sharon Lavigne
Alex Lawther
Penelope Lea
Noga Levy-Rapoport
Zion Lights
India Logan-Riley
Catarina Lorenzo
Dave Lowe
Ian Lowe

M 
Mary Mackey
Arshak Makichyan
Mazzella Maniwavie
Michael E. Mann
Jamie Margolin
Arkady Martine
Xiuhtezcatl Martinez
Chuck McDermott
Lynn McDonald
Amanda McKenzie
Bill McKibben
Róisín McLaren
Ayakha Melithafa
Yola Mgogwana
Mikaela Loach
George Monbiot
Sergio Rossetti Morosini
Marianna Muntianu
Mithika Mwenda
Nyombi Morris

N 

 Kamrun Nahar
 Vanessa Nakate
 Leah Namugerwa
 Luisa Neubauer
 Martin Newell
 Christine Nieves
 Ed Nijpels
 Wanjuhi Njoroge
 Nkosilathi Nyathi
 Carlos Nobre

O 

 Peggy Oki
 Adenike Oladosu
 Tamsin Omond
 Howey Ou

P 

 Ridhima Pandey
 Deborah Parker
 Kevin Patel
 Jadav Payeng
Autumn Peltier
 Sofie Petersen
 Simon Pirani
 Lilly Platt
 Rafe Pomerance
 Varshini Prakash
 Heydon Prowse

Q 

 Rod Quantock

R 

 Phil Radford
 Stefan Rahmstorf
 Disha Ravi
 Patrick Reinsborough
 Bruno Rodriguez
 Joe Romm
 Aliénor Rougeot
 Ronen Rubinstein

S 

 Chiara Sacchi
 Hossein Sadri
 Leila Salazar-Lopez
 Jim Salinger
 Marshall L. Saunders
 Stanley P. Saunders
 Allan Savory
 Jigar Shah
 Peggy Shepard
 Sofía Hernández Salazar
 Pablo Solón Romero
 Oscar Soria
 Daniel Spencer
 Tina Stege
 Mary Ellis Stevens
 Tristram Stuart
 Swami Sundaranand
 David Suzuki

T 

 Tahir Qureshi
 Tori Tsui
 Mitzi Jonelle Tan
 Jerry Taylor
 Morten Thorsby
 Greta Thunberg
 Bert Tucker

U 

 Marinel Sumook Ubaldo

V 

 Alexandria Villaseñor

W 

 Christopher O. Ward
 Elizabeth Wathuti
 Cédric Wermuth
Jalonne White-Newsome
Luke Wijohn
Melati and Isabel Wijsen 
Katharine Wilkinson
Pieter Winsemius

Y 

 Farhana Yamin
 Paul Yeboah
 Ruth Yeoh
 Allan Yeomans

Climate activists
 
Climate